Changlun–Kuala Perlis Highway, Federal Route 194, is a highway in Malaysia which links the state of Perlis with the main expressway of Peninsular Malaysia, the North–South Expressway. Most of the route of this highway used to be Kedah State Route K6 and Perlis State Route R6, while the Federal Route 81 is a short road from Route 7 to Kuala Perlis. Those roads were upgraded to a four-lane highway to provide better accessibility from the North–South Expressway.

The Kilometre Zero of the Federal Route 194 starts at Kuala Perlis.

Features
At most sections, the Changlun–Kuala Perlis Highway was built under the JKR R5 road standard, with a speed limit of 90 km/h.

Overlaps
 Kampung Titi Serong–Jalan Besar junctions (overlaps with the Federal Route 81)
 Pauh–Changlun (West): Jalan Arau–Changlun (overlaps with the Perlis state route 9 and Kedah state route 9)

List of interchange and towns

References

Highways in Malaysia
194